The International Journal of Radiation Biology is a monthly peer-reviewed medical journal that covers research into the effects of ionizing and non-ionizing radiation in biology. The editor-in-chief is Professor Gayle Woloschak.

The title was formerly known as International Journal of Radiation Biology and Related Studies in Physics, Chemistry and Medicine, having changed its name in 1988.

Abstracting and indexing 
The journal is abstracted and indexed in:
 Chemical Abstracts Service
 Index Medicus/MEDLINE/PubMed
 Science Citation Index Expanded
 Current Contents/Life Sciences
 BIOSIS Previews
 Scopus

According to the Journal Citation Reports, the journal has a 2014 impact factor of 1.687.

References

External links 

Publications established in 1988
Radiology and medical imaging journals
Monthly journals
Taylor & Francis academic journals
English-language journals